Ormtjernkampen is a former national park located in Gausdal municipality in the county of Oppland in Norway. It was in 2011 included in the larger Langsua National Park.

It was the smallest national park in Norway and consists primarily of virgin spruce forest, with some lakes and marshes.  It was established to preserve the virgin spruce forest that prevailed in Norway prior to the rise of forestry.

The park borders on the Ormtjernmyra nature reserve.

The name
The last element is the finite form of kamp m 'round mountain'. The first element is the name of the lake Ormtjernet - and this is a compound of orm m 'snake' (vipera berus), and the finite form of tjern n 'small lake, tarn'.

External links
 Map of Ormtjernkampen National Park

Former national parks of Norway
Protected areas established in 1968
Protected areas of Oppland
Tourist attractions in Oppland
1968 establishments in Norway
Gausdal